There are at least 74 named mountains in Garfield County, Montana.
 Adams Rocky Butte, el. 
 Baker Point, el. 
 Baldy Butte, el. 
 Barney Pinnacle, el. 
 Battleship Butte, el. 
 Biscuit Butte, el. 
 Black Butte, el. 
 Black Hills, el. 
 Blazier Butte, el. 
 Boslough Butte, el. 
 Brownie Butte, el. 
 Brownie Butte, el. 
 Buffalo Hill, el. 
 Buffalo Scott Butte, el. 
 Cap Rock Butte, el. 
 Castle Butte, el. 
 Castle Butte, el. 
 Chalk Butte, el. 
 Coal Bank Hill, el. 
 Coffin Butte, el. 
 Cox Butte, el. 
 Crown Butte, el. 
 Darby Buttes, el. 
 Elephant Butte, el. 
 Emma Butte, el. 
 Fig Mountain, el. 
 Finley Butte, el. 
 Froehlich Butte, el. 
 Hawks Nest, el. 
 Haystack Butte, el. 
 Hook Rock, el. 
 Indian Rocks, el. 
 Joe Ott Butte, el. 
 Kirts Butte, el. 
 Lambs Butte, el. 
 Little Buffalo Hill, el. 
 Little Chalk Butte, el. 
 Maloney Hill, el. 
 Manlove Butte, el. 
 McGinnis Butte, el. 
 McGlen Buttes, el. 
 McGraw Butte, el. 
 McTwigan Butte, el. 
 Montgomery Hill, el. 
 Mother Butte, el. 
 Mows Butte, el. 
 Neiter Butte, el. 
 O'Day Butte, el. 
 Phillips Buttes, el. 
 Pikes Peak, el. 
 Rattlesnake Butte, el. 
 Red Buttes, el. 
 Robbers Roost, el. 
 Round Butte, el. 
 Sage Hen Buttes, el. 
 Sandage Buttes, el. 
 School Butte, el. 
 Signal Butte, el. 
 Smoky Butte, el. 
 Square Butte, el. 
 Square Butte, el. 
 Standing Rock, el. 
 Strop Butte, el. 
 Table Top, el. 
 Thomas Butte, el. 
 Three Buttes, el. 
 Timber Butte, el. 
 Tindall Divide, el. 
 Turner Butte, el. 
 Twin Butte, el. 
 Twin Buttes, el. 
 Twin Buttes, el. 
 Waddington Dome, el. 
 White Buttes, el.

See also
 List of mountains in Montana
 List of mountain ranges in Montana

Notes

Landforms of Garfield County, Montana
Garfield